Joseph Panimayadas Chandrababu Rodriguez  (1927–1974) was an Indian actor, comedian, director, singer and dancer, whose Chaplinesque-style on-screen movements and singing style made him popular from the late 1940s to the early 1970s. He had a mastery of the Madras Bashai, a dialect unique to the Madras region. His slapstick style of comedy has been emulated by subsequent actors. Many of his songs have remained popular.

Early life
Chandrababu was born to a wealthy and eminent Christian Paravar family in 1927 at Tuticorin, India. His father, a freedom fighter, ran a paper called Sudhandhira Veeran which, along with the family assets, was seized by the British government in 1929 when he was arrested for participating in the satyagraha movement. He and the family were exiled to Colombo, Sri Lanka on his release, where his father worked for a Tamil newspaper. Chandrababu was educated at St. Joseph's College, Grandpass, Colombo and Aquinas College prior to his family moving once more, this time to Chennai in 1943. Here they lived in Triplicane, where his father worked for the Dinamani newspaper.

Film career
Chandrababu was very passionate about acting despite opposition from his family members. His friend Ganapathy was the only person who motivated his acting skills. From his childhood, he was an expert in singing and whenever he got together with his friends or family, Chandrababu was asked to sing. Sri Lanka had a very western outlook in those times and Chandrabubu picked up on western styles of singing and dancing while there. In these early years Chandrababu made acquaintances of the actors Sriram, B. R. Panthulu and, through them, T. R. Mahalingam. He made his debut with a small role in the 1947 film Dhana Amaravathi but struggled thereafter to obtain parts.

He had spent many days starving himself and searching for a chance in films. In 1952, he attempted suicide by ingesting copper sulphate crystals in the canteen of Gemini Studios. He had written a suicide note explaining his reasons, which included that he had been unable to meet the director S. S. Vasan, and that his body was to be handed over to B. S. Ramaiah, the director of his only film at that date. Suicide was a criminal offence and so he was arrested. But when his case came to trial the judge asked him to prove his acting ability. Chandrababu rendered a Shakespearean monologue that so impressed the judge that he was not jailed. One of those who had assisted him in being taken to hospital at the time of his attempted suicide was Gemini Ganesan. When Vasan learned of this episode he gave Chandrababu a small role in the 1952 film Moondru Pillaigal, which impressed Vasan so much that he predicted a successful career. for him. Chandrababu also filmed Chinna Durai and Mohana Sundaram in the same year.  It is claimed that, as of 2016, he remained the only person capable of yodelling in south Indian cinema,. Chandrababu loved western music and learned the art of yodelling by listening to singers such as Gene Autry and Hank Williams. In Chinna Durai, produced and directed by T. R. Mahalingam, he sang the song Poda Raja Podi Nadaya, the first time that yodelling had been heard in a South Indian film.Chandrababu was paid Rs 200 for his role in Mohana Sundaram. At his peak he was to command over Rs 100,000, becoming the first South Indian comedy actor to command such a sum.

When A. V. Meiyappan filmed Sahodhari, he found that it lacked an ingredient that would ensure box office success. Chandrababu was called and after watching the film he added a comedy track for himself, wrote it and also sang the song Naan oru muttalunga, converting the film into a hit. It was Chandrababu who first spoke and popularised the Madras Baashai in films. He learned this dialect from the rickshaw pullers and street vendors near his home in Triplicane and later in Mir Sahib Pet.

Sabaash Meena was one of the best Tamil comedy movies of its time, in which Chandrababu acted with Sivaji Ganesan, in dual roles. Chandrababu also established himself as a good singer. He was a playback singer rendering voice for himself in films. He lent his voice for S. Balachander for the song Kalyanam Kalyanam... Ullasamagave Ulagathil in Penn and for Sivaji Ganesan for the song Jolly Life Jolly Life in Kalyanam Panniyum Brammachari. Another song for comedian T.N. Sivadhanu is I Love You I Love You in Andhaman Kaidhi.

He sang under almost all of the music directors of the 1950s till the 1960s namely K. V. Mahadevan, T. G. Lingappa, G. Govindarajulu Naidu, S. V. Venkatraman, R. Sudarsanam, Viswanathan–Ramamoorthy, G. Ramanathan, S. M. Subbaiah Naidu, Vedha, S. Rajeswara Rao, T. R. Pappa, P. R. Mani, C. N. Pandurangan, Meenakshi Subramanyam and M. S. Viswanathan.

He sang along duets mostly with K. Jamuna Rani and L. R. Eswari. Other singers include A. G. Rathnamala, Jikki, A. P. Komala, T. M. Soundararajan, P. B. Sreenivas, A. L. Raghavan, P. Suseela, P. Leela, Soolamangalam Rajalakshmi, K. Rani and Manorama.

Marriage
Chandrababu first met Sheila, an Anglo Indian and grand daughter of Coimbatore-based filmmaker Swamikannu Vincent at her residence and subsequently marriage was arranged in 1958. Famous film personalities and politicians including chief minister Kamaraj attended their marriage. The initial days of married life had gone well. One day Sheila confessed that she fell in love with another person. After learning this, Chandrababu was heartbroken and ended up in a confused state. In the subsequent days, she attempted suicide which was foiled by Chandrababu.  Considering Sheila's fortune, they divorced formally. He continued to offer support to her until she left for London. After a few days, she married a doctor in London with the acceptance of Chandrababu by a letter communication. In a business mired by sycophancy, he chose not to mince his words and this restricted his opportunities from the 1960s onward. After this, he had decided to take a temporary break from his film career, and he went to Delhi without informing even his close friends. He spent those days consuming alcohol. Later he restarted his career in the industry despite his failed love and marriage.

Financial misfortune and death 
Chandrababu had arranged with a financier, to direct his first film Maadi Veettu Ezhai with M. G. Ramachandran as the hero. Eventually, he failed on this venture as Ramachandran failed to cooperate with him. The film project was also dropped. The reasons for Ramachandran's non-cooperation is well explained by script writer Aroordhas, in his 2002 memoirs Naan Muham Paartha Cinema Kannadigal. It's because Chandrababu became abusive towards Ramachandran's elder sibling M. G. Chakrapani. Chandrababu's final attempt was to direct and act in Thattungal Thirakkappadum in 1966; it was highly acclaimed for its cinematography but was not a box office success. It should be recorded that despite his indifference to the self-destructive life style of Chandrababu. MGR did offer a helping hand to him, by offering him a comedy slot in his own production, Adimai Penn released in 1969.

Due to his personal problems, Chandrababu spent his last days penniless. During his last years he stayed in the house of his good friend M. S. Viswanathan, until his death on 8 March 1974. It was Sivaji Ganesan who arranged all his final rites and he was buried in Quibble Island, Chennai.

Discography

Music composers he sang for

Playback singers he sang with
He sang memorable duets with mostly comical songs K. Jamuna Rani, L. R. Eswari, Jikki, P. Leela P. Susheela, A. P. Komala, Soolamangalam Rajalakshmi, A. G. Rathnamala, Manorama and K. Rani.

He also sang with other male singers such as T. M. Soundararajan, A. L. Raghavan, V. N. Sundaram, S. C. Krishnan, P. B. Sreenivas and T. G. Lingappa.

The following are some of Chandrababu's songs that have remained popular:

References

 Aranthai Narayanan: Thamil Cinemavin Kathai, New Century Book House, Chennai, 2002 2nd edition, pp 279–280.
 Aroordhas: Naan Muham Paartha Cinema Kannadigal, Kalaignan Pathipakam, Chennai, 2002, pp 184–201.
 Vamanan: Thirai Isai Alaigal, part 1, Manivasagar Pathipakam, Chennai, 2004 2nd edition, pp 595–605.
  Alt URL

External links 
 
 Article on J. P. Chandrababu in Kalyana Malai

1927 births
1974 deaths
Tamil comedians
Sri Lankan emigrants to India
Sri Lankan Tamil actors
Indian Roman Catholics
People from Thoothukudi
20th-century Sri Lankan male singers
20th-century Indian male actors
Singers from Tamil Nadu
20th-century comedians
20th-century Indian male singers
20th-century Indian singers